Ilyes Chaïbi (born 12 October 1996) is a French professional footballer who plays as a forward for Swiss club Servette U21.

Career
Chaïbi is a youth exponent from Monaco. He made his league debut on 30 January 2016 in a 3–0 away defeat against Angers replacing Bernardo Silva after 80 minutes.

On 1 August 2016, Chaïbi joined Ligue 2 club Ajaccio on loan for a season.

In September 2019, after over one year without club, Chaïbi returned to his childhood club Thonon Evian in the Régional 1.

On 20 July 2022, Chaïbi moved to Servette U21, the under-21 team of Servette, who were allowed to sign more experienced players.

Personal life
Born in France, Chaïbi is of Algerian descent. He is the older brother of Farès Chaïbi who is also a professional footballer.

Honours 
Thonon Evian
 Championnat National 3: 2021–22
 Régional 1 Auvergne-Rhône-Alpes: 2019–20

Notes

References

External links

1996 births
Living people
Algerian footballers
Algerian Ligue Professionnelle 1 players
French footballers
French sportspeople of Algerian descent
Association football forwards
Ligue 1 players
Ligue 2 players
Championnat National 2 players
Championnat National 3 players
Régional 1 players
Austrian Regionalliga players
AS Saint-Priest players
Thonon Evian Grand Genève F.C. players
AS Monaco FC players
AC Ajaccio players
FC Wacker Innsbruck (2002) players
MC Alger players
Servette FC players
French expatriate footballers
Expatriate footballers in Austria
French expatriate sportspeople in Austria
Expatriate footballers in Switzerland
French expatriate sportspeople in Switzerland
Footballers from Lyon
Swiss 1. Liga (football) players